Claire Robinson is a New Zealand political communications academic. As of 2018, she is a full professor and Pro Vice-Chancellor at the Massey University.

Academic career

After a 2006 PhD titled  'Advertising and the market orientation of political parties contesting the 1999 and 2002 New Zealand general election campaigns'  at the Massey University, Robinson joined the staff, rising to full professor.

Robinson was a finalist in both the 2015 and 2017 'Women of influence' awards and was a finalist in the Wellingtonian of the year 2017 awards. Robinson appears very frequently across a range of New Zealand news media on a range of political topics as a political commentator.

References

External links
 

Living people
New Zealand women academics
Academic staff of the Massey University
Massey University alumni
Political commentators
Year of birth missing (living people)